Daniel Mojon (born July 29, 1963, in Bern, Switzerland) is a Swiss ophthalmologist and ophthalmic surgeon who is considered to be the inventor of minimally invasive strabismus surgery (MISS), a method of surgically correcting squinting that uses only very small incisions of two to three millimeters and is supposed to lead to quicker rehabilitation and wound healing. Daniel Mojon is president of the program committee of the Swiss Academy of Ophthalmology (SAoO).

Scientific works 
Mojon has published several studies demonstrating the extent to which people with strabismus suffer discrimination and stigmatizing in daily life - squinting children, for instance, get invited, als Mojon could prove, to fewer birthday parties. Specialized in treating strabismus since the 1990s, Mojon developed minimally invasive strabismus surgery (MISS) as an alternative to conventional and more traumatizing surgical techniques that use a limbal approach to allow direct access to Tenon's space for horizontal muscle resection, recession or plication. Unlike these conventional techniques, minimally-invasive strabismus surgery is done using an operation microscope and usually under general anaesthesia. Reportedly, there is considerably less swelling the day after the operation after MISS than following more extensive surgical opening of the conjunctiva. The long-term outcomes with respect to alignment, visual acuity and complications were comparable. For his introduction of this technique, Mojon in 2020 was honored by the American Academy of Ophthalmology (AAO) as an "Unsung Hero".

Writings (selection) 
 Daniel Mojon and Howard Fine (Eds.): Minimally invasive ophthalmic surgery. Springer, Berlin 2010. 
 Mojon-Azzi SM, Kunz A, Mojon DS: The perception of strabismus by children and adults. Graefes Archive for Clinical and Experimental Ophthalmology 2011;249:753-757.
 Mojon-Azzi SM, Mojon DS. Opinion of headhunters about the ability of strabismic subjects to obtain employment. Ophthalmologica. 2007; 221: 430–3.
 Mojon-Azzi SM, Kunz A, Mojon DS. Strabismus and discrimination in children: are children with strabismus invited to fewer birthday parties? Br J Ophthalmol 2011; 95: 473–6.
 Kaup M, Mojon-Azzi SM, Kunz A, Mojon DS.Intraoperative conversion rate to a large, limbal opening in minimally invasive strabismus surgery (MISS). Graefes Arch Clin Exp Ophthalmol. 2011;249:1553-1557.
 Mojon DS. Comparison of a new, minimally invasive strabismus surgery technique with the usual limbal approach for rectus muscle recession and plication. Br J Ophthalmol 2007; 91: 76–82.
 Mojon DS. Minimally invasive strabismus surgery for horizontal rectus muscle reoperations. Br J Ophthalmol 2008; 92: 1648–1652.
 Mojon DS. Minimally invasive strabismus surgery. Eye (Lond). 2015; 29: 225–33. doi:10.1038/eye.2014.281. Epub 2014 Nov 28.
 Mursch-Edlmayr AS, Mojon DS, Ring M, Laubichler P, Luft N, Priglinger SG: Comparison of deep sclerokeratodissection, a new variant of nonpenetrating glaucoma surgery, with deep sclerectomy. Indian Journal of Ophthalmology 2016;64:914-918.

References 

1963 births
Swiss ophthalmologists
Academic staff of the University of Bern
20th-century Swiss physicians
Living people